Kadhim Waal  (1 January 1951 – 19 September 2017) was an Iraqi football striker who played for Iraq in the 1976 AFC Asian Cup. He also played for Al-Tayaran. He was the first captain of Iraq U20.

On 19 September 2017, Waal died at the age of 67.

Career statistics

International goals
Scores and results list Iraq's goal tally first.

References

External links
https://twitter.com/hassaninmubarak

1951 births
2017 deaths
Iraqi footballers
Iraq international footballers
1976 AFC Asian Cup players
Association football forwards